Bird on a Wire is a 1990 American  action comedy film directed by John Badham and starring Mel Gibson and Goldie Hawn. It was shot mainly in British Columbia, Canada. The title refers to the Leonard Cohen song "Bird on the Wire". The alley motorcycle chase scene was filmed in Victoria's Chinatown, in Fan Tan Alley.

Plot
Marianne "Muffie" Graves, a former hippie, is a successful lawyer completing a business deal in Detroit, Michigan. At a gas station, she crosses paths with a man that looks and sounds exactly like her hippie ex-fiancé Rick Jarmin, who disappeared in a plane crash 15 years previously and is presumed dead.

The man pretends to be a Vietnam War veteran and Marianne apologizes, says that Rick would never have served in that war, and then leaves. The terrified man then makes a call saying that he has been recognized and needs to be moved.

15 years earlier, Rick testified against murderous drug-smuggling DEA agent Eugene Sorenson and has been in the witness protection program ever since. Unfortunately, his old handler has retired and the new one, FBI agent Joe Weyburn, is being blackmailed into colluding with Sorenson. Promising to have Rick moved immediately, Weyburn leaks the gas station's address to Sorenson.

Meanwhile, Sorenson has been released on parole; his partner, Albert "Diggs" Diggins, picks him up and they set out to kill Rick for revenge and to smooth the passage of their new dealings with the Colombian drug cartels.

Marianne returns to confront Rick just as Diggs and Sorenson show up at the gas station with shotguns blazing. During the gunfight, Rick gets buckshot in his buttocks and his kindly old boss is killed. Marianne escapes with Rick, but Sorenson and Diggs pin the gas station owner's murder on Rick. They are forced to go on the run as Weyburn wipes out Rick's file and sends police to catch them.

To clear their names, Rick needs to reach his old handler. They use contacts from his former life-in-hiding, including at a beauty salon where he was pretending to be an effeminate gay man and was the star hairdresser, and an old flame, a veterinarian who removes the buckshot.

During a night spent in a hotel room, Rick tells Marianne everything that happened 15 years ago. They share their feelings and have passionate sex.

Reaching the home of his old handler, they find out he has Alzheimer's and thus doesn't remember Rick. Sorenson, Diggs and Weyburn show up, so Rick and Marianne retreat to a nearby zoo where Rick once worked. He releases animals from their cages to assist in their defense, and Diggs is mauled to death by a lion, while Weyburn is eaten by piranhas.

Sorenson winds up electrocuted. Wounded, Rick winds up suspended over a tiger in a pit, requiring Marianne to save him. When she is not quite able to reach him, he offers her the extra incentive of marriage and children, which does the trick. They are then seen boating into the sunset in the Caribbean.

Cast
 Mel Gibson as Richard "Rick" Jarmin
 Goldie Hawn as Marianne Graves
 David Carradine as Eugene Sorenson
 Bill Duke as Albert "Diggs" Diggins
 Stephen Tobolowsky as Joe Weyburn
 Joan Severance as Rachel Varney
 Jeff Corey as Lou Baird

Reception

Bird on a Wire gained a mixed to negative reception. Of 47 reviews that Variety considered in New York, Los Angeles, Chicago and Washington D.C., only 1 was favorable and 38 were unfavorable. Lor. of Variety called it "an overproduced, tedious road movie". The film holds a 26% rating on Rotten Tomatoes, based on 23 reviews.

Audiences polled by CinemaScore gave the film an average grade of "B+" on an A+ to F scale.

Box office
Bird on a Wire debuted at number 1 at the US box office with an opening weekend gross of $15.3 million and went on to gross over $138.6 million worldwide against a $20 million budget. It is considered a box office success.

References

External links

 
 
 
 
 

1990 films
1990 action comedy films
1990s chase films
1990s crime comedy films
1990 romantic comedy films
American action comedy films
American chase films
American comedy thriller films
American romantic comedy films
American crime comedy films
1990s English-language films
Films directed by John Badham
Films scored by Hans Zimmer
Films set in Detroit
Films set in Michigan
Films shot in Vancouver
Interscope Communications films
Universal Pictures films
Films about witness protection
1990s American films